Zuru is a Local Government Area in Kebbi State, Nigeria. Its headquarters is in the town of Zuru. It is also the Headquarters of Zuru Emirate. The Emirate comprises four local government areas, namely: Wasagu/Danko, Fakai, Sakaba and Zuru.

The postal code of the area is 872.

References

Local Government Areas in Kebbi State